National Highway 179A, commonly referred to as NH 179A, is a  national highway in India, which comes under Ministry of Road Transport & Highways, Government of India. It is a secondary route of National Highway 79.  NH-179A traverses the state of Tamil Nadu in India.

Route 
Salem, Harur, Uthangarai, Thirupathur, Vaniyambadi.

Junctions  

  Terminal near Salem.
  Terminal near Harur.
  near Uthangarai.
  Terminal near Vaniyambadi.

Project development 
Four laning of national highway 179A has been taken up along stretch from Harur to Vaniyambadi. Salem to Harur stretch is part of Chennai - Salem greenfield highway project which is also part of Bharatmala Pariyojana scheme. Chennai-Salem Greenfield Corridor under the Bharatmala Pariyojana, a centrally-sponsored and funded road and highways project, is a 277.30 km highway that involves the development of the Tambaram to Harur Section of NH-179B, Harur to Salem Section of NH-179A, Chengalpattu to Kancheepuram Section of NH-132B, Semmampadi to Chetpet Section of NH-179D and Polur to Tiruvannamalai Section of NH-38.

See also 

 List of National Highways in India
 List of National Highways in India by state

References

External links 

 NH 179A on OpenStreetMap

National highways in India
National Highways in Tamil Nadu